The Second Cabinet of Stauning was the government of Denmark from 30 April 1929 to 4 November 1935. It replaced the Madsen-Mygdal Cabinet, and was replaced by the Third Stauning Cabinet. This was the first coalition government in Danish history, consisting of the Social Democrats and the Social Liberal Party.

List of ministers
The cabinet consisted of these ministers, with some continuing into the Third Stauning Cabinet:

References

1929 establishments in Denmark
1935 disestablishments in Denmark
Stauning II